Christopher R. Wogan (born February 15, 1950) is a former Republican member of the Pennsylvania House of Representatives.

Biography
Wogan is a 1968 graduate of Cardinal Dougherty High School. He earned a degree in political science from La Salle University (then La Salle College) in 1972 and a law degree from the Temple University Beasley School of Law in 1975. He has served as a member of the U.S. Army Reserve and worked as staff counsel for SEPTA in the 1970s.

He was first elected to represent the 176th legislative district in 1980, a position he held until 2001, when he was elected judge of the Philadelphia County Court of Common Pleas. As a Republican, he was endorsed by both parties and the AFL-CIO Philadelphia Council and AFSCME District Council 33.

References

External links
 official PA House profile

Living people
Republican Party members of the Pennsylvania House of Representatives
1950 births
United States Army Command and General Staff College alumni
Temple University Beasley School of Law alumni
La Salle University alumni